The Battle of Osel Island took place on May 24, 1719 (O.S.), during the Great Northern War. It was fought near the island of Saaremaa (Ösel). It led to a victory for the Russian captain Naum Senyavin, whose forces captured three enemy vessels, sustaining as few as eighteen casualties. It was the first Russian naval victory which did not involve ramming or boarding actions.

Ships involved

Russia
Devonshire 52
Portsmouth 52
Raphail 52
Uriil 52
Varachail 52
Hyagudiil 52
Natalia 18

Sweden
Wachtmeister 52 - Captured
Karlskrona Vapen 30 - Captured
Bernhardus 10 - Captured

References
Naval Wars in the Baltic 1553-1850 (1910) - R. C. Anderson
http://www.neva.ru/EXPO96/book/chap2-3.html 

Battle of Ösel Island
Naval battles of the Great Northern War
1719 in Europe
History of Saaremaa
Naval battles involving Russia